Kucheryayevka is a rural locality (a selo) and the administrative center of Kucheryayevskoye Rural Settlement, Buturlinovsky District, Voronezh Oblast, Russia. The population was 530 as of 2010. There are 6 streets.

Geography 
Kucheryayevka is located 32 km east of Buturlinovka (the district's administrative centre) by road. Vasilyevka is the nearest rural locality.

References 

Rural localities in Buturlinovsky District